Raymond Curtis "Curt" Brinkman (November 21, 1953 – September 8, 2010) was the winner of the 1980 Boston Marathon in the men's wheelchair division. He was the first participant in the wheelchair division to come in faster than the fastest runner, coming in seventeen minutes faster than the traditional winner, setting a (then) world record of 1:55:00.  He also won several Paralympic medals.

References

External links 
 

1953 births
2010 deaths
People from Shelley, Idaho
Medalists at the 1976 Summer Paralympics
Medalists at the 1980 Summer Paralympics
Paralympic medalists in athletics (track and field)
Paralympic gold medalists for the United States
Paralympic silver medalists for the United States
Paralympic bronze medalists for the United States
Athletes (track and field) at the 1976 Summer Paralympics
Athletes (track and field) at the 1980 Summer Paralympics
Paralympic track and field athletes of the United States
American male wheelchair racers